ecto is a commercial weblog client for Mac OS X and Microsoft Windows.   It allows one to compose and store blog entries on the local desktop computer, then upload them to a weblog host.  ecto interacts with popular server software such as Blogger, Movable Type, and WordPress, among others.   The developer believes the additional flexibility of the desktop operating system allows the client to incorporate features lacking in web-based clients.  For example, ecto incorporates spell checking, easy insertion of images, and text formatting.  ecto employs the standard controls the operating system provides to all applications.   It can also trackback to other blogs and add categories and tags to a blog entry.  The Macintosh version integrates with iTunes and iPhoto.

Critical reception

AppleMatters gave ecto 9 out of 10.
The Windows variant of ecto was reviewed at Reviewsaurus, which despite noting ecto as one of the most respected blogging clients, gave it a more critical review for its lack of a single pane interface, and lack of FTP support.
New Communications Review provided a more favorable review ("4 stars out of 5") praising its feature set and the detailed control it gives over formatting one's posts.

References

Classic Mac OS software
Blog client software